Parak (also known as Barak) is a village in Taheri Rural District, in the Central District of Kangan County, Bushehr Province, Iran. At the 2006 census, its population was 2,088, in 405 families.

References 

Populated places in Kangan County